Telioneura is a genus of moths in the subfamily Arctiinae. The genus was described by Felder in 1874.

Species
 Telioneura albapex Druce, 1898
 Telioneura approximans Rothschild, 1922
 Telioneura ateucer Dyar, 1914
 Telioneura brevipennis Butler, 1877
 Telioneura fuliginosa Rothschild, 1910
 Telioneura glaucopis Felder, 1869
 Telioneura hypophaea Hampson, 1905
 Telioneura imbecillus Zerny, 1931
 Telioneura jocelynae Toulgoët, 1987
 Telioneura obsoleta Draudt, 1915
 Telioneura rosada Dognin
 Telioneura subplena Walker, 1854

Former species
 Telioneura carmania Druce, 1883

References

Arctiinae